Björling is a Swedish surname. Notable people with the surname include:

Anna-Lisa Björling (1910–2006), Swedish opera singer and actress
Carl Fabian Björling (1839–1910), Swedish mathematician and meteorologist
Carl Georg Björling (1870–1934), Swedish lawyer
Emanuel Björling (1808–1872), Swedish mathematician
Ewa Björling (born 1961), Swedish politician
Gunnar Björling (1887–1960), Finnish poet
Johan Alfred Björling (1871–1892/93), Swedish botanist and explorer
Jussi Björling (1911–1960), Swedish opera singer
Renée Björling (1898–1975), Swedish actress
Sigurd Björling (1907–1983), Swedish opera singer

See also
Björlin

Swedish-language surnames